Ruth McCue Bell Graham (June 10, 1920 – June 14, 2007) was an American Christian author, most well known as the wife of evangelist Billy Graham. She was born in Qingjiang, Jiangsu, Republic of China, the second of five children. At age 13 she was enrolled in Pyeng Yang Foreign School in Pyongyang, Korea, where she studied for three years. She completed her high school education at Montreat, North Carolina, while her parents were there on furlough. She graduated from Wheaton College in Wheaton, Illinois.

The Grahams met at Wheaton College and were married in the summer of 1943, shortly after their graduation. Ruth Graham became a minister's wife for a brief period in Western Springs, Illinois. She lived out the rest of her life in Montreat, North Carolina. The Grahams have five children: Virginia (Gigi), Anne, Ruth, Franklin, and Nelson Edman (Ned), 19 grandchildren, and numerous great-grandchildren.

Graham wrote Our Christmas Story, Sitting by My Laughing Fire, It's My Turn, The Legacy of a Pack Rat, Prodigals and Those Who Love Them, Clouds Are the Dust of His Feet, One Wintry Night, Coffee and Conversation with Ruth Bell Graham and Gigi Graham Tchividjian, Collected Poems, Mothers Together. and Prayers from a Mother's Heart. Her most recent books published in 2001 are, Never Let It End: Poems of a Lifelong Love published by Baker Books, Footprints of a Pilgrim: The Life and Loves of Ruth Bell Graham, published by Word Publishing and A Quiet Knowing, published by W Publishing Group.

Early life
Ruth McCue Bell was born in Qingjiang, Jiangsu, China (now the main district of Huai'an, Jiangsu, China). Her parents, Virginia Myers (Leftwich) and Dr. L. Nelson Bell, were American medical missionaries at the Presbyterian Hospital 300 miles north of Shanghai. She grew up in China in a deeply religious household.<ref name="wash">[https://www.washingtonpost.com/wp-dyn/content/article/2007/06/15/AR2007061500196.html AP via Washington Post "Billy Graham's Wife Ruth Dies at 87" June 15, 2007]</ref> Some of her early life in China is depicted in the biography of her father, a general surgeon, in A Foreign Devil in China (by John Charles Pollock).

Graham studied for three years at a high school in Pyongyang, now in North Korea, before graduating from a school in Montreat, North Carolina, while her parents were on furlough.

Married life
Graham returned to the U.S. at the age of 17 in the fall of 1937, and enrolled at Wheaton College, outside Chicago, Illinois, where she met Billy Graham. They married on August 13, 1943. In 1945, after a brief stint as a suburban pastor, her husband became an evangelist for Youth for Christ. The Grahams moved to Montreat near her parents where the Grahams continued to live for the rest of their married life. Despite her husband being one of the world's most famous Baptists, Graham remained a Presbyterian and often taught Sunday School.

Between 1945 and 1958, Graham gave birth to five children, whom she raised – sometimes single-handedly – while her husband was away on extended national and international evangelistic crusades. Their three daughters and two sons are all actively involved in ministry, including eldest son Franklin, who heads the Billy Graham Evangelistic Association (BGEA) founded by his father.

Ministry

In 1959, Graham published her first book, Our Christmas Story, an illustrated volume for children. She went on to write or co-write 13 other books, many of them works of poetry she wrote as an emotional release while her husband was so often on the road through the years.

Graham was a vital part of Billy Graham's evangelistic career, and he turned to her for advice and input about many ministry decisions. One of the early uses of media by the BGEA was the "Hour of Decision" radio program begun in 1950, which she named. After her upbringing in China and high school experience in Korea, she continued to have compassion for the people of Asia. She encouraged her husband to visit and later accompanied him during his historic visits to the People's Republic of China.

Graham's significant role in her husband's ministry was recognized in 1996, when they were jointly awarded the Congressional Gold Medal in a special ceremony in the U.S. Capitol Rotunda in Washington, D.C.

Philanthropy
In 1966, Graham founded the Ruth and Billy Graham Children's Health Center in Asheville, North Carolina, with which she was actively involved until her death.

Declining health and death

Graham had been in frail health since suffering spinal meningitis in 1995. This was exacerbated by a degenerative osteoarthritis of the back and neck that began with a fall while testing a swing she made for her grandchildren in 1974 that resulted in chronic back pain for many years. During the final months of her life, she was bedridden and had contracted pneumonia.

The day before Ruth Graham's death, Billy Graham released a statement through the Billy Graham Evangelistic Association stating, "Ruth is my soul mate and best friend, and I cannot imagine living a single day without her by my side. I am more and more in love with her today than when we first met over 65 years ago as students at Wheaton College."

On Monday, June 11, at Graham's request and subsequent to consultation with her family, she was removed from life support. On June 13, 2007, following her decline into a semi-coma, her husband announced that he and his wife had decided to be buried beside each other at the Billy Graham Library in Charlotte, North Carolina. She died at 5:05 pm. EDT June 14, 2007, at the couple's home, Little Piney Cove, in Montreat, North Carolina, with her husband and five children at her bedside, four days after her 87th birthday. A private ceremony followed by burial on the grounds of the Billy Graham Library was held on Sunday, June 17, 2007.

In a statement released from Wheaton College, Duane Litfin, president of the school, remarked, "Strong, steady, and dauntless, Ruth Bell Graham was the glue that held many of the parts of their lives together."

Bibliography
Graham was a poet and writer, authoring or co-authoring 14 books, as well as a regular contributor for newspapers and magazines.Our Christmas Story, 1959Family Bible Library, 1971 (Board of Editorial Advisors)Sitting by My Laughing Fire, 1977 (revised 2006)It's My Turn, 1982Legacy of a Pack Rat, 1989Prodigals and Those Who Love Them, 1991Clouds are the Dust of His Feet, 1992One Wintry Night, 1994Collected Poems, 1997Prayers from a Mother's Heart, 1999Footprints of a Pilgrim: The Life and Loves of Ruth Bell Graham, 2001Never Let It End: Poems of a Lifelong Love, 2001

With Gigi Graham: Coffee and Conversation With Ruth Bell Graham and Gigi Graham Tchividjian, 1997Mothers Together, 1998A Quiet Knowing, 2001

Her biography, A Time for Remembering (later reissued as Ruth: A Portrait''), was an early work of novelist Patricia Cornwell.

References

External links
Billy Graham Evangelistic Association
Memorial at Billy Graham Evangelistic Association
Obituary in The Times

1920 births
2007 deaths
20th-century American non-fiction writers
20th-century American women writers
20th-century Presbyterians
21st-century American non-fiction writers
21st-century American women writers
21st-century Presbyterians
American expatriates in China
American Presbyterians
American women non-fiction writers
Burials in North Carolina
Congressional Gold Medal recipients
Graham family
People from Buncombe County, North Carolina
People from Huai'an
Presbyterian writers
Wheaton College (Illinois) alumni
Writers from North Carolina